Ghizer may refer to several divisions and places in Gilgit-Baltistan, Pakistan:

 Ghizer District (2019–), a current district of Gilgit-Baltistan
 Ghizer Tehsil, a tehsil of Ghizer District
 Ghizer District (1974–2019), a former district of Gilgit-Baltistan
 Ghizer River, an alternative name of Gilgit River 
 Ghizer Valley or Koh-i-Ghizer, an alternative name of Golaghmuli Valley